Gareth Mitchell is a Welsh technology journalist, lecturer and former broadcast engineer.

Early life 

Mitchell was born Gareth James Mitchell in Eastleigh, England to a Welsh father, Colin Mitchell. He spent his childhood in Montgomeryshire, Powys, Wales. When Gareth was seven, his father lit up a bulb with a closed circuit, and that sparked his interest in science. He has a brother named Julian.

He was a member of the computer society at school (Welshpool High School) and participated in bellringing and organ playing at his local church. As an undergraduate studying Electrical and Electronic Engineering at Imperial College London, Mitchell joined campus radio working behind the scenes, but saw that "[t]he people who seemed to be having all the good fun were the creative types in the studios." Because of that, after getting his engineering degree and relevant work, he took up an MSc in Science Communication, also at Imperial, a decision which made his parents concerned at the time.

Broadcasting 

Mitchell joined the BBC during the mid-1990s, starting his career as a broadcast engineer. His initial dream was to be part of Tomorrow's World, BBC's flagship technology TV programme, but a visit to a radio studio at Bush House got him obsessed about radio journalism. Mitchell eventually decided to trade climbing TV and radio transmitter towers for science and technology journalism. He had worked for Radio Netherlands on science programmes.

His first hosting role on the BBC was for the youth science program, The Lab. Occasionally, he had also presented Science in Action and The Science Hour on the BBC World Service, and on TV Click.

He presents on the BBC most notably as the host of Digital Planet (previously known as Click and Go Digital)  a BBC radio programme broadcast worldwide on the BBC World Service with Bill Thompson. From time to time, he is a stand-in presenter for BBC Inside Science on BBC Radio 4. Additionally, Mitchell had written for the Q & A section of the BBC (Science) Focus Magazine and regularly hosted their podcast from 2008 to 2017.

Lecturing 

Mitchell has lectured at Imperial College London since 1998 in broadcast and written journalism on the Science Communication Unit since 2000 or 2002. He also presents the Imperial College Podcast. The key event leading to his appointment as a radio tutor was a bet in a pub over a Guardian job advertisement for that role.

He emceed TEDx Imperial. He has attended the World Economic Forum and has hosted workshops, discussion panels and conferences on science and technology.

Personal life

Apart from the bells and the organ, other instruments Mitchell could play are the piano/keyboard and guitar. He rides motorcycles, can fly a plane, and is a licensed amateur radio operator since August 2019. One of his intriguing inventions was reviving the clocks he'd bought at an auction for items from Bush House, the BBC World Service's former headquarters. He misses the pubs.

References

External links 
 Gareth Mitchell's YouTube videos
 Gareth's OpenLearn articles for the Open University
 Gareth Mitchell's articles for BBC Science Focus Magazine
 

Living people
Welsh journalists
Academics of Imperial College London
People from Eastleigh
BBC World Service presenters
BBC people
1970 births